Paterson Street is a street in Causeway Bay, Hong Kong Island, Hong Kong. It starts north at Victoria Park Road, crosses Kingston Street and Great George Street and ends at Yee Wo Street or  Canadian Street  to the south.

The street was named after William Paterson, a partner of Jardine Matheson & Co., the company which owned most parts of today's Causeway Bay in the 19th century. The first McDonald's branch in Hong Kong was opened on 8 January 1975 in Hang Lung Centre, on Paterson Street.

Illegal parking and waiting is a persistent problem along Paterson Street. In the 1990s, the southern portion of Paterson Street, between Great George Street and Yee Wo Street,  was restricted to buses, and then in July 2000, converted to a pedestrian street.

See also

List of streets and roads in Hong Kong

References

Causeway Bay
Roads on Hong Kong Island